The black-capped catbird (Ailuroedus melanocephalus) is a species of bowerbird (Ptilonorhynchidae), native to southeastern New Guinea.

This species was formerly considered a subspecies of the spotted catbird before being reclassified as a distinct species in 2016. Martin Irestedt and colleagues examined the black-eared, spotted- and green catbird species complex genetically and found there were seven distinct lineages: the green catbird (A. crassirostris) of eastern Australia and the spotted catbird (A. maculosus) of eastern Queensland being the earliest offshoots, followed by the Huon catbird (A. astigmaticus) and black-capped catbird (A. melanocephalus) of eastern New Guinea, the  Arfak catbird (A. arfakianus) of the Bird's Head (Vogelkop) Peninsula, the northern catbird (A. jobiensis) of central-northern New Guinea, and black-eared catbird (A.melanotis) of southwestern New Guinea, Aru Islands and far North Queensland.

References

black-capped catbird
Birds of the Papuan Peninsula
black-capped catbird